UHF is an album by the Canadian rock band UHF, consisting of singer-songwriters Bill Henderson of Chilliwack fame, Shari Ulrich, and Roy Forbes. It was released in 1990.

Tracks
 "When I Sing" (3:25)
 "Holding Out for You" (4:00)
 "Keep Lightin’ That Fire" (3:55)
 "Day by Day" (4:42)
 "Golan Boys" (4:01)
 "Running Back to Her" (3:56)
 "House Up On the Hill" (4:58)
 "Can’t Go Home" (3:20)
 "When Life Explodes" (3:59)
 "One Step Closer to the Light" (2:52)
 "Wings for the Sky" (4:45)
 "Do I Love You" (4:05)

Members
Bill Henderson – guitar, piano, vocals
Shari Ulrich – piano, violin, mandolin, vocals
Roy Forbes – guitar, vocals

1990 albums
UHF (Canadian band) albums